Lug is a village in western part of the Serbian province of Vojvodina, in the municipality of Beočin, South Bačka District. It lies on the northwest slopes of Fruška gora mountain, in the region of Syrmia. The village has a population numbering 801 people (2002 census), most of them being ethnic Slovaks.

History
The village originates from the late 19th century, when the local land owner Odescalchi employed people from Bački Petrovac and Gložan, Slovak villages across the Danube, in order to satisfy growing timber export. At first, they resided seasonally and returned to their villages. In order to ensure more permanent work force, they offered them cleared forest land as loan, at the location of the later village. In 1910, the village had 371 residents, and in the mid-century around 500.

Economy
The residents are mostly engaged in agriculture, with a part working in nearby Beočin.

Culture
Cultural society "Mladost", with folklore section, maintains the Slovak traditions and dances. The village twice hosted the Slovak cultural festival "Tancuj, tancuj", and their members acted in various folklore festivals across Europe.

Historical population

1961: 764
1971: 775
1981: 824
1991: 864
2002: 801

See also
List of places in Serbia
List of cities, towns and villages in Vojvodina

References
 Slobodan Ćurčić, Broj stanovnika Vojvodine, Novi Sad, 1996.

External links
 

Populated places in Syrmia
South Bačka District
Beočin
Slovaks of Vojvodina